Nidularium antoineanum is a plant species in the genus Nidularium. This species is endemic to Brazil.

Cultivars
 Nidularium 'Antoiniana'
 × Niduregelia 'Anson'

References

BSI Cultivar Registry Retrieved 11 October 2009

antoineanum
Flora of Brazil